Johana Gustawsson is a French-Swedish crime writer. She was born in Marseille. She studied Political Science and has worked as a journalist for the Frencha and Spanish press. 

She is best known for her Roy & Castells crime series, featuring the profiler Emily Roy and the true-crime writer Alexis Castells. The Roy & Castells books have won numerous prizes and have been published in two dozen countries. The third novel in the series, Blood Song, was longlisted for the CWA International Dagger. 

Gustawsson lives in London with her family.

References

French writers
Year of birth missing (living people)
Living people